SPIS may refer to:

 Second Philippine International School, a Philippine international school in Riyadh, Saudi Arabia
 Scottish Police Information Strategy, former name of the Scottish Police Services Authority – Information Communications Technology
(Senate) Preparedness Investigating Subcommittee of the United States Senate, involved in the Fulbright Hearings
 Pias Airport (ICAO code), Pias, Peru
 Spiš, a region in north-eastern Slovakia, with a very small area in south-eastern Poland
 Spiš Castle, one of the largest castle sites in Central Europe
 Spiš county, an administrative county of the Kingdom of Hungary

See also
 SPI (disambiguation)